The Archdeacon of Bath is a senior ecclesiastical officer in the Church of England Diocese of Bath and Wells. The post, having oversight over the archdeaconry of Bath, has existed since the twelfth century. The archdeaconry includes five deaneries.

List of archdeacons
Some archdeacons without territorial titles are recorded from around 1086; see Archdeacon of Wells.

High Medieval
bef. 1100–aft. 1120: Gerbert
bef. July 1141–aft. 1154: Martin
aft. 1154–aft. 1165: Thomas (I)
: Baldwin
–bef. 1176: John Comyn
bef. 1182–aft. 1206: Peter of Blois (also Archdeacon of London from 1202)
–aft. 1212: John of Colchester (disputed)
bef. 1214– (d.): Hugh of Wells
–aft. 1236: Nicholas de Neville
bef. 1238–aft. 1246: Henry Tessun
bef. 1247–aft. 1248: Nicholas Tessun
bef. 1257–1257 (res.): Robert de Chauncy (afterwards Bishop of Carlisle)
bef. 1259–1259 (res.): John de Cheam (afterwards Bishop of Glasgow)
bef. 1264–aft. 1266: Walter de Merton (also Lord Chancellor;
later Bishop of Rochester, 1274)
bef. 1268–aft. 1269: Thomas (II)
bef. 1277–aft. 1285: Ralph de Wicham/Wikham
bef. 1292–aft. 1294: Thomas of Axbridge
bef. 1295–bef. 1297: Iterius Bochard of Angoulême

Late Medieval
8 February 1309 – 1333 (d.): Henry of Sandwich
–29 September 1342 (exch.): Matthew de Valenciis
29 September 1342 – 1353 (d.): Walter de Hulle
7 March 1353–aft. 1366: John Power
bef. 1380–1380: Hugh Herle
1380–bef. 1386: Ranulf de Gorce de Monterac
23 July 1386–bef. 1428 (res.): Roger Harewell
30 January 1428 – 10 December 1449 (exch.): Thomas Warde
10 December 1449–bef. 1460 (d.): William Sprever
26 February–May 1460 (res.): Hugh Sugar/Norris
6 May 1460–bef. 1497 (d.): Richard Lichefeld
17 March 1497 – 1498 (res.): William Cosyn (afterwards Dean of Wells)
31 March–July 1499 (res.): Thomas Beaumont (later Archdeacon of Wells)
12 July 1499 – 1502 (res.): John Pikman
4 September 1502 – 1518 (d.): Thomas Tomyow
bef. 1535–17 October 1535 (d.): Robert Shorton
bef. 1536–November 1557 (d.): Walter Cretyng

Early modern
bef. 1561–aft. 1569: James Bonde
28 November 1570 – 1584 (res.): Tobias Matthew (afterwards Dean of Durham)
1 April 1584 – 12 March 1614 (d.): William Powell
18 April 1614 – 1 April 1638 (d.): Timothy Revett
2 April 1638 – 1643 (res.): William Piers (afterwards Archdeacon of Taunton)
30 December 1643–bef. 1661: William Davis
6 June 1661 – 23 June 1690 (d.): John Sellick
31 October 1690 – 11 December 1711 (d.): William Clement
31 December 1711 – 1733 (d.): William Hunt
5 September 1733 – 19 April 1743 (d.): Lawson Huddleston
21 May 1743 – 1761 (res.): Samuel Squire (also Dean of Bristol from 1760;
afterwards Bishop of St David's)
26 May 1761 – 1767 (res.): Thomas Camplin (afterwards Archdeacon of Taunton)
12 February 1768 – 25 July 1786 (d.): John Chapman
26 September 1786 – 18 July 1798 (d.): Edmund Lovell
28 July 1798 – 11 June 1815 (d.): James Phillott
22 July 1815 – 1817 (res.): George Trevelyan (afterwards Archdeacon of Taunton)
26 April 1817 – 27 May 1820 (d.): Josiah Thomas
17 June 1820–bef. 1839 (res.): Charles Moysey
6 March 1839 – 19 August 1852 (d.): William Brymer
17 September 1852 – 11 October 1860 (d.): William Gunning

Late modern
1860–1895: Robert William Browne
1895–1909: Hilton Bothamley
1909–29 September 1924 (d.): Lancelot Fish
1924–1938: Sydney Boyd
1938–1947: William Selwyn (afterwards Bishop suffragan of Fulham)
1947–1962: Edwin Cook
1962–1971: Arthur Hopley
1971–1975: Tom Baker (afterwards Dean of Worcester)
1975–1995: John Burgess
1996–2004: Bob Evens (afterwards Bishop suffragan of Crediton)
May 200530 June 2017 (ret.): Andy Piggott
4 July5 November 2017: Chris Hare (acting)
5 November 2017present: Adrian Youings

References

Sources

Lists of Anglicans
 
Lists of English people